HMS Scott was the lead ship of her class of flotilla leaders for the V- and W-class destroyers built during the First World War, and the class would unofficially be named after her. Completed in 1918, the ship was assigned to the Harwich Force and was sunk by either a naval mine or by a German submarine in August while escorting a convoy. The ship herself was the first to bear the name Scott and was named after Sir Walter Scott, 1st Baronet.

Design and description
The Admiralty type flotilla leaders were designed by the Director of Naval Construction to meet a requirement from Admiral Sir John Jellicoe, commander of the Grand Fleet, for a large flotilla leader with better seakeeping abilities than the Lightfoot-class. They displaced  at normal load. Their crew consisted of 188 officers and ratings. Scott was powered by two Parsons geared steam turbine sets, each driving one shaft, using steam provided by four Yarrow boilers.

The ships were armed with five BL 4.7-inch (120 mm) guns in single mounts protected by gun shields. They were arranged in two superfiring pairs fore and aft of the superstructure and the remaining gun was positioned on a platform between the funnels. While under construction, the ships were altered to accommodate a single  AA gun on a platform abaft the rear funnel and a pair of single two-pounder AA guns on single mounts. They were also fitted with two triple mounts for 21-inch (533 mm) torpedo tubes between the 3-inch AA gun and the rear pair of 4.7-inch guns. For anti-submarine work, they were equipped with four depth charges in individual chutes at the stern.

Construction and career
Scott was laid down by Cammell Laird at their shipyard in Birkenhead on 19 February 1917, launched on 18 October 1917 and completed on 16 January 1918 at a cost of £342,570, complete with guns and ammunition. After working up, the ship was assigned to the 10th Destroyer Flotilla in the Harwich Force. While escorting a small convoy from the Netherlands to England on 15 August, the destroyer HMS Ulleswater was struck by either a mine or a torpedo near the Dutch coast. While manoeuvreing to assist the stricken ship, Scott was hit twice in quick succession, the first of which detonated her forward magazine. The ship sank about fifteen minutes later with the loss of 22 crewmen. The cause of her sinking is unclear, although the German submarine  which had been patrolling and mining the area is usually credited with her sinking.

Wreck

References

Bibliography
 
 
 
 
 

 

Admiralty type flotilla leaders
1917 ships
World War I destroyers of the United Kingdom
Ships sunk by German submarines in World War I
World War I shipwrecks in the North Sea
Maritime incidents in 1918
Ships built on the River Mersey
Naval magazine explosions